The European Board of the Gaelic Athletic Association or Gaelic Games Europe is one of the  international units  (outside of Ireland) of the Gaelic Athletic Association (GAA), and is responsible for organising Gaelic games in continental Europe. Gaelic Games Europe is also responsible for the European Gaelic football, hurling, camogie and ladies' Gaelic football teams which compete every three years at the GAA World Gaelic Games.

The first evidence of Gaelic games in Europe dates back to a hurling match in 1774 in Belgium, various games were played across the continent after that with their frequency increasing in the late 20th century.

While sporadic attempts were made to form clubs and organise competitions, the first four clubs were organised into a 'County' Board at a meeting in 1999 organised by Joe McDonagh, the then president of the GAA. Since then, growth has resulted in over 100 clubs spread across 24 countries, catering for over 5,000 players who play camogie, hurling, men's and ladies football and handball competitions.

The European County Board (ECB) changed its name to Gaelic Games Europe at the Annual Convention in Leuven (Belgium) in November 2016.

Structures

Membership
Gaelic Games Europe governance structures promote a volunteer culture. Every member is equal and every registered club can influence policies. Any member can submit a motion to their club's annual general meeting suggesting new policies, amendments to an existing policy or propose changes to the playing rules. If approved, the motion is discussed at the Gaelic Games Europe Annual Convention.

Two members of European clubs have been recognised for their long service and dedication to developing Gaelic games. Mary Gavin, who founded Den Haag GAA club in 1979 and was involved in the establishment of the European Board in 1999, received a GAA Presidents Award in 2013. The Camogie Association also named their World Gaelic Games trophy in her honour in 2019. Tony Bass, a GAA administrator and referee, was secretary of Cuala GAA club and served on various Dublin GAA county and Leinster Council committees before moving to the Netherlands and establishing the Maastricht Gaels club in 2004 was recognised with a GAA President's Award in 2021. Bass has been GGE chairperson, secretary, development officer and represented Europe on the GAA Central Council and at multiple GAA, LGFA and Camogie congresses.

Annual convention 

Every club can send between two and four delegates to the Annual Convention which is the main decision making body for Gaelic games in Europe. Five official regions are also entitled to appoint one delegate each. Delegates discuss issues, decide on motions and elect Officers to serve on the Management and European (County) Committees. Motions to change GAA playing (or other governance) rules, if approved, are then submitted to the Annual Congress of the Gaelic Athletic Association, the Ladies' Gaelic Football Association or the Camogie Association which take place every year in Ireland.

Regions 
Clubs across Europe are assigned to a "region". Each region elects a "Regional Committee" which is responsible for organising competitions and developing Gaelic games in their area. The GGE Management (MC) or European (EC) Committees may delegate other tasks. Regions elect one EC representative each and are also represented on many sub-committees. There are five regions, Benelux, East and Central, Iberia, North West and Nordics, two of which are divided into "sub-regions".

In the wake of Russia's invasion of Ukraine, the Minister for Sport in Ireland Jack Chambers signed a statement that Russian based athletes and administrators should be banned from participation and representation internationally.   Almost all sporting organisations within Europe have adhered to this policy.  Support for this policy was reaffirmed in February 2023 by the new Irish Minister for Sport Thomas Byrne, who stated "Pending an improved situation in Ukraine, I urge the sports movement to stay the course and continue to exclude those that are not respecting such important instruments in the international sporting landscape as the Olympic Truce.” 
 Despite this, Russian based teams and administrators enjoy full membership of Gaelic Games Europe. In the aftermath of controversial comments regarding war crimes in Ukraine  by a Russian based administrator of Gaelic Games Europe, the GAA issued a statement that the comments were made “in a personal capacity and do not reflect the views of the GAA”. The administrator however remained a member of management committee of Gaelic Games Europe. 

As of 2019, the regions included:

Competitions

Competitions formats 
In GAA terms 'Europe' comprises all of continental Europe (excluding Ireland & Great Britain) with great distances between each team, so Gaelic Games Europe has various competition formats.

Since 2006, men's and ladies football competitions have been played on a regional basis. Teams play in regional competitions and may also enter European Football Championships. Some regions also have their own competitions (e.g. Brittany, Galicia).

Many of the regional competitions use a system of 'rounds' (also called 'tournaments') spread over a number of months with 3-5 rounds being the norm in regional football championships. Each round is competed in a single day with teams playing a single round-robin group or multiple groups followed by knock-out style play-offs (e.g. quarter & semi-finals) and a final which determine the ranking of every team present on the day. Teams are awarded points (25 points for the winner, 20 points for the runner-up, etc.) which are added to those accrued in other rounds to determine the competition winners for that season.

All men's (11-a-side) and ladies (9-a-side) teams may enter the European Football Championships which is a one-day event, usually in October. Teams are seeded into different grades (Senior, Intermediate and Junior). Each team plays 3-4 group games before progressing to the play-off stages of a Championship, Shield & Plate competition depending on their results.

The 'Premier' championships are for 15-a-side teams in men's and ladies' football and are organised on a 'knock-out' basis - as is usual in GAA championships with 60 minute games - played over a number of weekends in Maastricht, where there is a full-GAA size astroturf pitch, or other regional venues. Winners then represent Europe in the All Ireland Club Championships.

The European camogie and hurling championships are played by teams (9-a-side) from across Europe who compete together over five 'rounds' in various cities between May and October annually.

Other matches such as internationals (which have featured France, Italy, Germany, Galicia and Brittany) are also played, along with national 'Cup' competitions confined to teams in a single country e.g. Finland, Germany.

Every three years, a variety of camogie, hurling and ladies/men's football teams from Europe compete in the GAA World Games in both Irish-born and Non-Irish categories.

Gaelic football (men)

Senior Championship

Intermediate Championship (formerly 'European Shield')

Junior "A" Championship

European Premier Football Championship (15-a-side)

Ladies' Football

Past winners

European Ladies Senior Gaelic Football Championship

European Premier ladies Football Championship (15-a-side)

Hurling

Past winners

European Hurling Championship

Camogie

Past winners

European Camogie Championship

Affiliated clubs
These are the 105 affiliated clubs (November 2022.)  located across 25 countries and organised into five "regions" (Benelux, Central-East, Iberia, Nordics and North-West) for competition purposes. Various "sub-regions" such as Brittany (France), Galicia and Andalucia (Spain) have their own competitions as well as playing in regional championships.

References

External links
 

Gaelic games governing bodies
GAA